"The Green Leaves of Summer" is a song by Paul Francis Webster, with music by Dimitri Tiomkin, written for the 1960 film The Alamo. It was performed in the film's score by the vocal group The Brothers Four. In 1961, the song was nominated for an Academy Award; its parent soundtrack, for the film The Alamo, was awarded a Golden Globe Award for Best Original Score.

History
In The Alamo, the song is heard on the last night before the Battle of the Alamo. Davy Crockett (John Wayne), when asked what he is thinking, responds "not thinking. Just remembering" as the song is heard. The men of the Alamo reminisce on their lives and reflect on their own mistakes, faith, and morality.

The song itself has no lyrical connection to the Alamo, or to any other historical events, but is simply a nostalgic reminiscence of the narrator's idyllic youth.

The basic theme is reminiscent of the opening of Vivaldi's La Follia.

Chart performance
The Brothers Four recording of the song went to #65 on the US, Hot 100.

Other recordings
"The Green Leaves of Summer" has been covered by a number of musicians including:
Sil Austin
Kenny Ball & His Jazzmen
Herb Alpert & the Tijuana Brass
Frankie Avalon
the Ray Conniff Singers
Ken Dodd
Anita Harris
The Springfields
Hampton Hawes
Mahalia Jackson
Frankie Laine
the Johnny Mann Singers
Patti Page
Nick Perito
Peter and Gordon
The Ventures
A French-language translation, "Le Bleu de l'été", was performed by Michèle Arnaud and Maya Casabianca (fr), A version by Les Compagnons de la chanson reached No. 3 on the French and Belgian charts.
A Finnish-language translation, "Kesän vihreät lehvät", written by Sauvo Puhtila, was performed by both Eino Grön and Vieno Kekkonen (fi).

Popular culture
The song had renewed interest when Nick Perito's version was featured in the title sequence of the 2009 film Inglourious Basterds, directed by Quentin Tarantino.

References

1960 songs
Songs written for films
Songs with music by Dimitri Tiomkin
Songs with lyrics by Paul Francis Webster
Songs about nostalgia
The Brothers Four songs